Satrangi (English: Seven Colors of Rainbow) was a 2008 Pakistani travel adventure drama series produced and directed by Imran Hussain which was broadcast on Geo TV. It was written by Jawad Daud. This drama was first of its kind that was based on what youngsters think, what they are going through and how their families do not understand their problems. Though this series did not get much publicity, it was much loved by the youngsters as they could easily relate to the story.

Plot summary
This is a story of seven friends (four boys and three girls) who came from different backgrounds and had clashes with their parents. They all decided to leave their homes and go somewhere else to live a life of their own. They actually travelled whole of the Pakistan from Karachi to Azad Kashmir. They started their journey from Karachi and went on to visit all of the provinces of Pakistan. In that journey they visited all the famous and historical places. In between, their personal trials were also shown from family issues to love affairs and from humor to suspense; all was going side by side. It was mixture of travel, adventure and struggles of all the members. Moreover, it tells that how can you manage to live with different personalities.
Behzaad is a filthy rich guy who is always at daggers drawn with his busy lawyer father. Nashmia is a middle-class girl who has stopped eye contact with her mother ever since she remarried. Raayaan is a middle class guy with white-collared job. Shehzore is from a remote village who believes that urban life was invented for him. Khayyam thinks that he is a musician who has yet to find his instrument and his style of music. Rushna is a girl who doesn't act like a girl at all because she became a tomboy completely. Bisma is more in need of love than being in search of love. These seven people embark on a journey of a lifetime. Behzaad builds a special mini-bus for this purpose. These youngsters board it and leave from Karachi. Superficially, for all of them, this is just a tour that will take them to Khyber in just three days. But actually, the travel stretches to months as each one discovers that everyone on this journey has a lot of emotional baggage. And, more importantly, they don't have to be together to form rainbow. Actually, each one of them is a rainbow.

Cast 
 Fawad Khan as Behzaad
 Sawera Pasha as Nashmiya 
 Agha Ali as Khayyam
 Ambreen gul as Rushna
 Hamza Ahmed as Shehzore
 Seher Gul as Bisma
 Zohaib as Raayaan

Soundtrack 

Satrangi Re title song is sung by Fawad Khan and lyrics by Nadeem Asad.

Scripting
The first draft of the initial concept was written in November 2006.

The first version of this soap was based in a college with these seven friends. Even the first few episodes were also written. At that time, another soap was being made by Everready called College. To break new grounds, the writer and director sat down thinking. The writer took the same characters, and put them in a bus instead of the college or a hostel.

Shehzore'''s character was supposed to fall for an English girl over the Internet. She was supposed to actually travel all the way from England and fall for Khayyam instead.

During discussion and development, the writer had six characters (three boys and three girls) in mind. But then the writer felt if the show had an odd number (two guys and three girls or four guys and two girls), it would add more dynamic and improbability to the equation: there won't be any fixed couples. The writer also had Satrangi (Seven Colored) stuck in his head. He thought of the title first and went backwards to characters. He came up with four girls and three guys. But due to casting constraints and non-availability of girls, the production had to settle for four guys and three girls.

The scenes of jungle in the third and fourth episode were actually shot in Malir, Karachi. The village was also near Karachi. The dhaaba where they meet the Pathan kid was half an hour out of Karachi as well.

The writer was really particular about Neshmiya and Behzaad as these two characters were closest to his heart. With them, he could bring insanity to sane moments and humor to the most banal scenes. Actually, the first character trait he wrote about both of them on his thinking board was the same: 'unpredictable'. With Sawera Pasha on board, the show had a surefire hit character. The writer wanted to gradually make her intricate and add layers to her in coming episodes. Sawera Pasha showed she had the panache to carry those emotional outbursts and confusions that came as part and parcel.

 Casting 
During the scripting process, the writer and director clearly knew that Fawad Khan just had to be part of this soap. This decision was based on an Independence Day play Kal that had the same writer-director combo. The only difference was, the director wanted him as Khayyam, the musician because Fawad Khan was a musician and vocalist in real life. But the writer saw Fawad Khan as the driver of the bus: metaphorically, the one steering the lives of the remaining six characters. Driving them together and apart at his own discretion, the writer saw Behzaad as that powerful a character. Mercifully, he was able to drive his point home and Fawad Khan appeared as Behzaad''.

References

Urdu-language television shows
Geo TV original programming